Ewing Island is an ice-covered, dome-shaped island  in diameter, lying  northeast of Cape Collier, off the east coast of Palmer Land. It was discovered from the air on November 7, 1947, by the Ronne Antarctic Research Expedition (RARE), under Finn Ronne, who named it for Dr. Maurice Ewing of Columbia University, who assisted in planning the RARE seismological program.

References 

Islands of Palmer Land